Alberto Zayas Govín (February 14, 1908 – 1983) was a Cuban rumba singer and songwriter who founded one of the first recorded rumba ensembles, Grupo Afrocubano Lulú Yonkori. He is considered one of the most important guaguancó vocalists/composers in the history of rumba.

Life and career 
Alberto Zayas Govín was born in the Pueblo Nuevo neighborhood of Matanzas on February 14, 1908. When he was one year old his family moved to Havana. At age 14 he lived in El Cerro district of Havana and sang in coros de clave, the precursor ensembles of the guaguancó. There he earned the nickname "El Melodioso" (The Melodious One). In 1925 he moved to Guanabacoa, another district of Havana. According to several accounts, Zayas played with several son ensembles such as Sexteto Habanero and Sexteto Boloña, before focusing on rumba and other Afro-Cuban genres.

Zayas became a collaborator of ethnomusicologist Fernando Ortiz and in 1941 he invited anthropologist Harold Courlander to an Abakuá ceremony in Guanabacoa. This meeting yielded part of the 10 hours of recorded material that are kept at the Archives of Traditional Music (Indiana University), some of which were released by Folkways Records in 1951 under the title Cult Music of Cuba.

During the 1950s, his ensemble, Grupo Afrocubano Lulú Yonkori, featured lead singers Roberto Maza and Carlos Embale, backing vocalists Adriano Rodríguez, Bienvenido León, Mercedes Romay and Juanita Romay, and percussionists Giraldo Rodríguez and Gerardo Valdés among others. They recorded four LPs for Panart, which have been called "some of the first authentic rumba recordings in Cuban history" by ethnomusicologist Ivor Miller (University of Calabar). The first one was Guaguancó afro-cubano (1956), which featured the hit "El vive bien", penned by Zayas. It was followed by El guaguansón (1957), credited to "Alfredito Zayas y su Grupo Folklórico". The next record was Afro-frenetic. Tambores de Cuba (1958), and in July 1959 the band released a conga album Congas y comparsas del carnaval habanero (Side-B included recordings by Carlos Barbería). In 1961, Impresora Cubana de Discos released two tracks by Zayas' ensemble with Pacho Alonso on lead vocals.

Zayas would continue his career in theatre shows and radio broadcasts, and he toured abroad as director of the Grupo Folklórico Cubano. Zayas died in 1983 in Guanabacoa.

Discography

Albums
1956: Guaguancó afro-cubano (Panart)
1957: El guaguansón (Panart)
1958: Afro-frenetic. Tambores de Cuba (Panart)
1959: Hi-Fi Cuban Drums (reissue, Capitol)
1959: Congas y comparsas del carnaval habanero (Panart)
2001: El yambú de los barrios (compilation, Tumbao Cuban Classics)

Singles
1955: El vive bien / Congo mulenze (Panart)
1956: La chapalera / Que me critiquen (Panart)
1956: Se corrió la cocinera / Tata Perico (Panart)
1956: Una rumba en la bodega / El yambú de los barrios (Panart)
1956: Ya no tengo amigos / A mi no me tocan campana (Panart)

Notes

References

1908 births
1983 deaths
20th-century Cuban male singers
Cuban songwriters
Male songwriters
Cuban bandleaders
Cuban percussionists
Musicians from Havana
Rumba singers